Roberta Stark (born 2 July 1956) is an American former professional tennis player.

A native of Jacksonville, Stark competed on the professional tour in the 1970s. 

Stark qualified for the main draw of the Wimbledon Championships for the only time in 1975, losing her first round match in three sets to Linda Mottram. In 1976 she had a US Open main draw win over Florența Mihai.

References

External links
 
 

1956 births
Living people
American female tennis players
Tennis people from Florida
Sportspeople from Jacksonville, Florida